Six Feet Under, an American television drama series created by Alan Ball, aired on the premium cable network HBO. The series chronicles the Fishers, a family of funeral directors who struggle with relationships and their own personal demons, while trying to maintain a small funeral home.

Series overview

Episodes

Season 1 (2001)

Season 2 (2002)

Season 3 (2003)

Season 4 (2004)

Season 5 (2005)

Ratings

References

External links
 
 

 
Lists of American drama television series episodes
Lists of black comedy television series episodes